"Somebody to Love" is a song by the British rock band Queen, written by the lead singer/pianist Freddie Mercury. It debuted on the band's 1976 album A Day at the Races and also appears on their 1981 compilation album Greatest Hits.

The song has similarities to Queen's earlier hit "Bohemian Rhapsody" with its complex harmonies and guitar solos; however instead of mimicking an English choir, the band turned to a gospel choir. It reached  2 in the UK and No. 13 on the Billboard Hot 100 in the US. The song demonstrated that "Queen could swing as hard as it could rock, by channeling the spirit of gospel music".

Written by Mercury at the piano, "Somebody to Love" is a soul-searching piece that questions God's role in a life without love. Through voice layering techniques, Queen was able to create the soulful sound of a 100-voice choir from three singers: Mercury, Brian May, and Roger Taylor. John Deacon did not sing backing vocals on the recorded album. Mercury's fascination and admiration for Aretha Franklin was a major influence for the creation of this song.

Queen played "Somebody to Love" live from 1977 to 1985, and a live performance of the song is recorded on the album Queen Rock Montreal. In addition to these live performances, there were collaboration tributes to "Somebody to Love" after Mercury's death in 1991. The song was played live on 20 April 1992 during The Freddie Mercury Tribute Concert, with George Michael on lead vocals.

Since its release in 1976, the song has appeared in several television shows, such as the Idol franchise, The X Factor, and Glee, as well as films, including Happy Feet and Ella Enchanted. It has also been covered by many artists.

Background
Like "Bohemian Rhapsody", the major hit from Queen's previous album A Night at the Opera (1975), "Somebody to Love" has a complex melody and deep layering of vocal tracks. But while "Bohemian Rhapsody" was based on English choir styles, "Somebody to Love" was based on a gospel choir arrangement. It was the first single from A Day at the Races, on which Mercury, May and Taylor multitracked their voices to create the impression of a 100-voice gospel choir. The lyrics, especially combined with the gospel influence, create a song about faith, desperation and soul-searching; the singer questions both the lack of love experienced in his life, and the role and existence of God. This is reinforced by frequent use of word painting. The lyrics also speak to the feelings of desperation and isolation that accompany trying to find love as a queer man in an unaccepting and lonely world ("I just gotta get out of this prison cell. Someday I'm gonna be free."). Staying true to Queen's guitar-driven style, it was also filled with intricate harmonies and a notable guitar solo by May, and it went to No. 2 on the UK Singles Chart and No. 13 on the Billboard Hot 100 in the U.S.
Written in the key of A major, the song features dramatic intervalic contrasts, ranging from F2 in the harmonies on the line "Can anybody find me?" to A2 to a C5 in full voice up to an A5 in falsetto in the lead vocals, all sung by Mercury. The band have spoken of sections of the song which were recorded but never made it onto the final mix of the song, some of which have been leaked online. 

A promotional video was made combining a staged recording session at Sarm Studios (where the A Day at the Races album was recorded) and film footage of the band's record breaking performance at Hyde Park that September. Peter Hince, the head of Queen's road crew, recalled to Mojo magazine: "Aesthetically, you had to have all four around the microphone, but John (Deacon) didn't sing on the records. By his own admission, he didn't have the voice. He did sing on-stage but the crew always knew to keep the fader very low."
The song was included on their first Greatest Hits, released in 1981.

Reception
Billboard stated that the song grabs attention with gimmicks such as changes in volume and tempo and the use of classical music elements. Cash Box said that "sounding like the Harvard Chorale on the opening and backing up Freddie Mercury might be their idea of a logical progression from 'A Night At The Opera" and "there’s a grand finale, with handclapping and thundering percussion."  Record World said that "the group continues to stretch the limitations of the commercial single" by incorporating "operatic overtures" along the lines of "Bohemian Rhapsody."  Los Angeles Times critic Robert Hilburn said that "its gospel-tinged urgency maintain's the English band's knack for arrangements that are at once off-beat, yet well within the broad rock mainstream.

Live performances

The song was a staple of the A Day at the Races and News of the World tours in 1977–78. For the Jazz and Live Killer tours, it was also played consistently. In The Game Tour, it was only played early in the tour. It was also played for South America Bites The Dust, Live at the Bowl and Queen Rock Montreal. Later in The Works Tour, a shortened version was played as a medley preceding "Killer Queen". A live version from the 1984/85 tour was recorded and filmed on the concert film, Final Live in Japan 1985.

When performed live, Mercury would often alter the melodies of the song, but would generally hit the sustained A4 notes throughout the song. The A4 at the peak of the building line "can anybody find " on the studio version was not part of Mercury's original melody, but the other band members felt that it worked better than his. Live, Mercury sang his original take on this line.

This was also one of few tracks where Deacon sang backing vocals when performed live. His voice was clearly heard on bootlegs from the band's performance at Earls Court in June 1977 and at the Houston Summit in December 1977.

Even after Mercury's death in 1991, renditions of "Somebody to Love" have been performed live with the remaining band members, May and Taylor, and a number of different lead singers. At the Freddie Mercury Tribute Concert held at Wembley Stadium, the song was performed by George Michael. Michael's performance of "Somebody to Love" has been hailed as "one of the best performances of the tribute concert". The song was later rereleased in 1993 as the lead track of an EP called Five Live, which reached No. 1 in the UK. This version is also available on Greatest Hits III, released in 1999.

The song was performed on the setlists of their Queen + Adam Lambert tours in 2012, 2014-2015 & 2016 featuring Adam Lambert and at the iHeartRadio Festival 2013 as Queen + Fun.

Personnel
Freddie Mercury - lead and backing vocals, piano
Brian May - electric guitar, backing vocals 
Roger Taylor - drums, backing vocals
John Deacon - bass

Charts

Weekly charts

Year-end charts

Certifications

Other versions

George Michael and Queen version

George Michael performed the song with Queen's remaining members at the Freddie Mercury Tribute Concert in April 1992. It was included as the first track on the 1993 EP Five Live, credited to George Michael and Queen with Lisa Stansfield. As part of the EP, the cover reached No. 1 on the UK Singles Chart for three weeks.

Charts

Weekly charts

Year-end charts

Certifications

Troye Sivan version

In November 2018, Australian singer Troye Sivan released a version of the song. The song was released to coincide with the release of the film Bohemian Rhapsody. Universal Music Group released three tracks by different artists channeling their inner Freddie Mercury; this is the third and final installment, following Shawn Mendes' "Under Pressure" and 5 Seconds of Summer's "Killer Queen" released in October 2018. Similarly to the aforementioned tracks, proceeds from the single benefit the Mercury Phoenix Trust.

In a statement, Sivan said "I'm so beyond honored to have been asked to cover 'Somebody to Love' by Queen, a masterful song by the most legendary band."

Reception
Queen's manager Jim Beach said Sivan's version "is both moving and totally original." Luke Schatz of Consequence of Sound said "While Mercury’s version soared with choir-like vocals and dramatic instrumentation, Sivan employs a more mellow, minimalist approach. Here, his calming voice is accompanied by little more than bass and keys."

References

External links
Official YouTube videos: at Freddie Mercury Tribute Concert (with George Michael), Clip from Queen: Days Of Our Lives documentary
Lyrics at Queen official website
The Sunday Freeman - review
Queenpedia - detailed worldwide release information

Queen (band) songs
1976 singles
1993 singles
George Michael songs
Songs written by Freddie Mercury
Music videos directed by Bruce Gowers
LGBT-related songs
Elektra Records singles
EMI Records singles
Hollywood Records singles
Parlophone singles
1976 songs
Troye Sivan songs
Gospel songs